The Hôtel Albert Ciamberlani, occasionally also referred to as the Hôtel Veuve Ciamberlani (meaning House of Widow Ciamberlani), is a listed building in Ixelles, Brussels, Belgium. It was built in 1897 as the private residence of the symbolist painter Albert Ciamberlani and commissioned by his mother. The architect was Paul Hankar, but Ciamberlani himself provided the designs for the large sgraffito decoration on the facade.

The building, which was renovated in 2006, is one of the best-preserved buildings by Hankar. It is described in the official list of architectural heritage of Brussels as an "exceptional private house in Art Nouveau style" and art historian  has described its facade as one of the most beautiful Art Nouveau facades in Belgium.

History
Paul Hankar received the commission to design the building from the mother of symbolist painter Albert Ciamberlani soon after having finished a project for a private residence for his friend Henri Renkin in 1897. The large lot was almost opposite his own house on the /. Hankar also produced designs for the house of the brother of Albert, José Ciamberlani, in the vicinity.

Hankar initially struggled with finding a solution for the unusually wide facade. In his first draft, the facade was dominated by large windows, with a central bow window. The second draft split the facade in a broadly uniform, upper part and a lower part which was divided around a central axis, but retained the dominance of glasswork. The final design was more complex, and dominated by the large sgraffito designed by Ciamberlani. The house was built in 1897. It was one of a succession of private houses in Brussels designed by Hankar, mostly for friends, between 1897 and 1900.

In 1927, the lower part of the facade was heavily altered, and a garage added. Architect Albert Devez was responsible for these changes. The original furniture, also designed by Hankar, has been dispersed and is now kept in the collections of Design Museum Gent in Ghent.

The building has been listed since 1983. The facade was renovated in 2006. The Hôtel Ciamberlani is one of the most well-preserved buildings designed by Hankar.

Description
For the final design of the facade, Hankar came up with a complex solution where several different influences coexist. A motif of round openings, inspired by traditional Chinese moon gates, is superimposed over a facade divided horizontally in a way that is inspired by medieval architecture, conveyed via Hankar's contemporaries Antoni Gaudí and Richard Morris Hunt. It is dominated by two materials, white brick from Silesia and white stone from Euville, providing a juxtaposition of colours. In the central section, the facade becomes more monumental as it is dominated by the two large, horseshoe arch windows, and the geometric decoration of the rest of the facade expands into a richer, floral decoration.

It consists of a large, central composition and, just under the roof, a string of medallions. The central composition depicts in allegorical form the different stages of life, under the canopy of a large pear tree. The medallions have been proposed to depict either the Labours of Hercules or hunting scenes. Ciamberlani's decoration for the facade shows influence from the works of Walter Crane and similarities with works by Antoine Bourdelle.

Art historian  has described its facade as one of the most beautiful Art Nouveau facades in Belgium. He notes that it lacks what he calls the "Gothic" element of Louis XV style, "which artists of the time abused, both in Brussels and Nancy". In the official list of architectural heritage of Brussels it is described more succinctly as an "exceptional private house in the geometrical Art Nouveau style."

Inside, the spatial layout was a more traditional variation of a layout found in many Belgian houses at the time, with the exception of the first floor which was dominated by a wide room facing the street. For the rest, the right side of the building contained the drawing room, dining room and a veranda, while the left side of the building contained an office, the stairwell and a smaller dining room. The top floor contained four bedrooms, and two bedrooms were also located on the main floor.

See also
 Art Nouveau in Brussels

References

Sources cited

External links
 

Houses in Belgium
Art Nouveau architecture in Brussels
Houses completed in 1897
Ixelles
Paul Hankar buildings